Yo-kai Watch 2: Bony Spirits  and Yo-kai Watch 2: Fleshy Souls  are a pair of 2014 role-playing video games developed and published by Level-5 for the Nintendo 3DS. The games are a sequel to 2013's Yo-kai Watch, and were released in July 2014 in Japan, in North America and Australia in late 2016, and Europe in 2017. Much like their predecessor, the games put players in an open world, befriending and battling various yōkai, which are ghosts and apparitions originating in Japanese folklore, that cause mischief in daily life. In Yo-kai Watch 2, the memories of the protagonists Nathan "Nate" Adams and Katie Forester are erased when their Yo-kai Watch is stolen, leaving them with no recollection of their past adventures. However, they soon stumble across their Yo-kai butler Whisper once again, and their adventures resume.

Developed in the wake of the first game's rising popularity, Yo-kai Watch 2 became one of the most highly anticipated releases in Japan in 2014. Released to positive critical reception and an overwhelmingly successful commercial response, the games easily became two of the best-selling games on the Nintendo 3DS, boosted by the established popularity of the Yo-kai Watch anime series and various merchandising efforts. By February 2015, the games had sold 3.1 million copies. A third version of the game, was released in Japan in December 2014, which further expanded upon the changes introduced in the original versions of the game. By June 2015, the third version had sold over 2.6 million copies. The game was released in English regions as Psychic Specters on September 29, 2017.

Gameplay

Much like its predecessor, Yo-kai Watch 2 is an open world role-playing video game, where the player is given control of player character Nathan Adams or Katie Forester. Players navigate around the open world, using the Nintendo 3DS' touchscreen to find and befriend various Yo-kai scattered across the overworld. Players can give enemy Yo-kai a food item that they like before or during battle to have a chance at befriending them after winning the battle. After the battle, any of the enemy Yo-kai may approach the player character and give them its Yo-kai Medal, allowing it to be used in the player's team. A new feature in battles is using the Yo-kai Watch Model Zero to use "G Soultimate" moves, which are more powerful Soultimate moves that use up the Soul meters of all adjacent Yo-kai. The Model Zero also allows the use of “Poking”, which uses the touch screen to find a particular sweetspot on an enemy Yo-kai to increase the likelihood of befriending it. Other sweetspots can be poked to gain extra damage, money, or experience. Yo-kai can also be acquired through the Crank-a-kai (Gasha Machine) by collecting in-game coins or using Play Coins. Certain Yo-kai are necessary for completing the game's main quest, and some Yo-kai can be acquired through various subquests. Yo-kai can evolve into more powerful versions of themselves if they reach a certain level or combine with a particular item or Yo-kai. The Yo-kai are divided amongst eight different classes called “Tribes”, each with their own strengths and weaknesses. There are also Legendary Yo-kai that can only be obtained by collecting a particular set of Yo-kai listed in the Yo-kai Medallium, a compendium of the different Yo-kai the player has encountered or befriended. When the player encounters a Yo-kai, they battle it using six previously befriended Yo-kai. The touchscreen is used during battles to rotate the player's Yo-kai in battle, clear up status effects on the player's Yo-kai, or charge up the Yo-kai's Soultimate abilities. While the original Yo-kai Watch featured nearly 250 Yo-kai, Yo-Kai Watch 2 features nearly 450, including several that were featured as bosses in the original game.

Synopsis

Plot
While Nathan Adams or Katie Forester (depending on player choice) are sleeping during summer break, two Yo-kai take the Yo-kai Watch away and erase the main character's memories of the events of their interactions with Yo-kai. The following morning, their parents argue over two different brands of doughnuts called "Spirit Doughnuts" and "Soul Doughnuts". Later on, they end up running across a mysterious shop called the "Memory Shop", where the shopkeeper offers them a watch for a cheap price. They further end up freeing Whisper, who has also lost his memories, from a capsule machine. After their memories are regained thanks to the Yo-kai Watch's activation, they go on to befriend Jibanyan once again, before finding that the Memory Store has mysteriously disappeared. The following day there are reports of crows stealing shiny objects. The protagonist goes to meet their friend, Eddie, and becomes involved in chasing after his new high-tech watch when a Yo-kai becomes involved in its theft.

A couple of days later, the protagonist goes to Springdale Elementary and notices a giant shadow towering over the school. They go to Timers & More to get their Yo-kai Watch upgraded by Mr. Goodsight but must complete a number of tasks for him beforehand. After getting the watch upgraded, they go to school at night to investigate. They eventually find that the source of the shadow is a giant skeleton Gashadokuro Yo-kai, Gutsy Bones. The next day, the protagonist encounters a large cat Yo-kai in the Shopping Row who appears to be turning objects around him gigantic. The Yo-kai hypnotizes them into feeling the need to travel to the nearby country town of Harrisville, so they decide to visit their grandmother who lives in that town. After they arrive in Harrisville, they encounter a dispute between some Yo-kai, who claim that there is bad water between two Yo-kai factions called the "Fleshy Souls" and the "Bony Spirits". The following day, the protagonist ends up encountering the same large Yo-kai from before who turns out to be Hovernyan, a cat Yo-kai from 60 years in the past who grew huge after absorbing soul energy over many years. Hovernyan then tells the protagonist that their grandfather, named Nathaniel Adams or Kenny Forester respectively depending on whether you're playing as Nate or Katie, needs their help, and uses his Time Stone to transport them and company to 60 years in the past.

Arriving in the past, the characters encounter people who have been inspirited by "Wicked Yo-kai", a type of Yo-kai that even the protagonist cannot see with the Yo-kai Watch. They also encounter a younger version of their grandfather, a wild youth who acts like a superhero named "Moximous Mask", and looks almost identical to the protagonist. After attempting to meet with their grandfather, who isn't too keen on letting them help, they come across plans by him for building the Yo-kai Watch, with it being revealed that their grandfather created the Yo-kai Watch. This version of the watch could detect Wicked Yo-kai, something which was later removed from the present-day watch after Wicked Yo-kai no longer existed. The protagonist and company search for pieces needed to build the watch, and also find and free five "Classic" Yo-kai which were particularly close to their grandparent: Pallysol, Mermaidyn, Faux Kappa, Predictabull, and Gnomey. They later meet the two evil Yo-kai who stole the protagonist's Yo-kai Watch and memories, to reveal themselves to be Kin and Gin, Wicked Yo-kai with the ability to rewind time. After defeating Kin and Gin with some help from the Classic Yo-kai, the protagonist's grandfather accepts them as their "sidekick".

Having returned to the present, Jibanyan and the protagonist get into a petty argument which leads to Jibanyan running away from home. Jibanyan is then whisked away from the present by Kin and Gin, returning to being a living cat called Rudy, living with his owner, Amy. Eventually, he goes back through the events of the day he died, in which he prevented Amy from getting hit by a truck, by getting hit in her place. Kin and Gin attempt to convince him to let Amy die in his place, but Rudy saves Amy again anyway and returns to the present. That same night, a Yo-kai couple, Ray O'Light and Drizzelda, are set upon by Eyeclone, whose rage over their display of affection causes a typhoon in Springdale. Another Yo-kai, Brokenbrella, sees this occurring and goes to the protagonist for help. The protagonist then defeats Eyeclone, stopping the typhoon and saving Ray O'Light and Drizzelda.

Hovernyan appears again, asking the protagonist to come back to the past. When they arrive, Hovernyan tells them that a large battle is occurring between the "Fleshy Souls" and "Bony Spirits", two factions of Yo-kai that have been at war for hundreds of years. The protagonist goes to the battlefield in hopes of ceasing the conflict, although ends up fighting on behalf of either the "Bonies" or the "Fleshies" depending on which version is being played. In Bony Spirits, the protagonist fights with Venoct on the Bonies side, and in Fleshy Souls they will fight with Kyubi on the Fleshies side. Defeating the general of the opposing side, they are told that the reason the war began was an argument about doughnut fillings, which escalated over time. The protagonist's grandfather then arrives and reveals that many of the Yo-kai on the battlefield are actually Wicked Yo-kai in disguise. Kin and Gin arrive, followed by their master, Dame Dedtime, who is the boss of all Wicked Yo-kai.

Dame Dedtime gets one of her servants, Unfairy, to attack the group, but he is restrained by the joint efforts of the generals for both the Fleshy Souls and Bony Spirits, Toadal Dude and Arachnus. The protagonist learns of a Yo-kai called Master Nyada that could grant them the power to fight the Wicked Yo-kai. After finding him and completing his trials, Master Nyada gives them a hose, telling them it will give them the power to beat the Wicked Yo-kai. They return to Unfairy, who has broken free from Toadal Dude and Arachnus, and can hear Master Nyada telling them to "use the hose". Whisper and Jibanyan eventually end up, somewhat inadvertently, using the hose to knock down Unfairy, giving the protagonist the chance to take him down. After this, Toadal Dude and Arachnus call an official truce to the conflict between their two factions. However, Wicked Yo-kai have begun to swarm Springdale and Dame Dedtime unleashes a "Dedcloud" that will take control of humans and change the future into one in her image. She then sends the protagonist and their companions to the future that will exist if her plans are not stopped, in which Springdale is overrun by Wicked Yo-kai who control the joyless citizens and Yo-kai.
 
The protagonist finds a way to get back to the past, where they set about attempting to destroy the machines producing the Dedcloud. They are then eventually led towards Dame Dedtime's base of operations. While their grandfather tries to hold off Kin and Gin with Hovernyan, the protagonist tries to take down Dame Dedtime but finds that their efforts are in vain as she appears to be immortal, thanks to Kin and Gin rewinding time. However, Hovernyan gives the protagonist's grandfather the milk bottle tops with the names of the Classic Yo-kai that he had saved. Finally able to accept himself as their friend and someone they see as a hero, Nathaniel/Kenny calls out to the Yo-kai for help, causing the milk bottle tops to transform into Yo-kai Medals, and the Yo-kai Watch Model Zero to appear on his wrist. He uses them to summon the Classic Yo-kai and takes down Kin and Gin for good. The protagonist battles Dame Dedtime again and is this time able to defeat her. Enraged by her loss, she then begins to absorb the life force of the humans of Old Springdale, leaving behind only darkness, vowing that she'll take away joy and time from all humans as revenge for them doing the same thing to her when she had been convicted of a crime she didn't commit during her human life. Darkness spreads across the world, and the power she absorbs transforms her into her more powerful form, Dame Demona. The protagonist and crew are able to defeat Dame Demona, saving humanity and turning the protagonist's present back to normal. Afterwards, the protagonist's grandfather promises to finish work on creating the Yo-kai Watch, and thanks the protagonist for everything they've done. The protagonist then returns to their own time, with Whisper and Jibanyan in tow.

Characters

Development
The games were developed in the wake of the booming popularity of the Yo-kai Watch franchise in Japan. Sequels to the original Yo-kai Watch game were planned from the very beginning, including the plan to split the sequel into two versions, Ganso and Honke. The decision to create two different versions of the game came about as a marketing strategy to appeal to children, and a response to the development team finding that many children and their parents were playing and sharing one copy of the game with each other, thus, two copies of a game would be a plausible resolution.

Marketing

The Yo-kai Watch 2 games were originally revealed in an April 2014 issue of the Japanese manga magazine CoroCoro Comic. The announcement notably came shortly before Level-5 announced that the original Yo-kai Watch had surpassed a milestone of 1 million units shipped. The game's premise and release date, along with improvements upon the original Yo-kai Watch, were detailed in the game's original announcement, which also stated that both the Ganso and Honke versions of Yo-kai Watch 2 would feature Jibanyan Yo-kai Medal toys exclusive to each game, each unlocking a unique Soultimate move for the Jibanyan the player befriends in the game. The games were released on July 10, 2014, both as a physical copy and as a digital download on the Nintendo eShop. A version of the Nintendo 3DS XL, featuring the series' mascot character Jibanyan pictured on the front and the back of the console, was also released concurrently. However, it did not come bundled with either of the Yo-kai Watch games and was sold separately. The limited edition of the console instead came bundled with the six AR cards and a data card featuring the Golnyan Yo-kai, which can be read by the 3DS and used in-game for Yo-Kai Watch 2. Unlike the original game, a demo was not released on the Nintendo eShop prior to the games' release, however, an exclusive Nintendo Direct presentation was broadcast on June 4, 2014, highlighting the many new features of the games.

By the time Yo-kai Watch 2 was released, the anime series, airing on the TX Network and TV Tokyo and originally created to promote the first Yo-kai Watch game, had aired over 25 episodes and had become a major contributor to the franchise's growing popularity and sales. The television commercial created to advertise Yo-kai Watch 2 capitalised on the success of the anime series by staging a crowd performing the dance to "Yo-kai Exercise No. 1" by Dream5, the ending theme song for the television series. Under a thousand people were gathered in a shopping mall decorated with Yo-kai Watch banners and imagery to film three commercials that aired during the month of the games' release in Japan. After the successes of Ganso and Honke, an additional third version of the game, Yo-kai Watch 2: Shinuchi, was unveiled by Level-5 in October 2014, once again in an issue of the CoroCoro Comic magazine. Physical releases of the game included a Buchinyan Yo-kai Medal toy, which could be read as a QR code by the Nintendo 3DS system for use in-game. Digital download versions of the game include an additional "Maskednyan" Yo-kai. The game's December 2014 release coincided with the theatrical release of Yo-kai Watch: Tanjō no Himitsu da Nyan!, a film based on Yo-kai Watch 2.

Ganso and Honke were localized in English and released on September 30, 2016, in the United States as Bony Spirits and Fleshy Souls, respectively; Bony Spirits and Fleshy Souls subsequently were released in Australia on October 15, 2016 and in Europe on April 7, 2017. Shin'uchi was localized in English as Psychic Specters and released on September 29, 2017, simultaneously in Europe and the United States. Prior to the release of Psychic Specters, the version 2.0 update for Bony Spirits and Fleshy Souls was released as the "Oni Evolution" update on September 14, 2017. "Oni Evolution" enabled the older versions to link and trade data with Psychic Specters.

Merchandise
Level-5 teamed up with Japanese manufacturers Bandai and Bandai Namco Holdings to create various merchandise to further promote the games. Many different lines of toys were manufactured, the most notable of which are models of the Yo-kai Watch itself, which became one of the best-selling and fastest-selling toys in Japan. The watch, which can be used interactively with separately sold Yo-kai medals, was notable for its constant sellout of stock, and difficulty in finding and obtaining. The short supply of the toy had prompted high second-hand sales of the watch through online auction sites such as eBay, and also caused retailers such as Toys R Us to adopt a raffle ticket system to sell the product. A partnership between Bandai and with fast food restaurant chain McDonald's also saw sets of Aikatsu! cards, featuring Yo-kai Watch characters, being included with the chain's trademark happy meal. The popularity of the Aikatsu! cards also caused congestion in many McDonald's restaurants across Japan. Other merchandise released in the wake of Yo-kai Watch 2 include school utensils and office supplies, plushies, tissues, shampoo, bicycles, and even food such as Yo-kai Watch branded cereal, bread, drinks and furikake, amongst other available products.

Bandai Namco have reported having earned ¥10 billion yen (equivalent to $93 million US dollars) off Yo-kai Watch toy lines alone, from April to September 2014. Japanese chart and statistics company Oricon named the Yo-kai Watch brand the second best selling in 2014, behind Disney's Frozen. This kind of love for the Yo-kai Watches transferred to America. The Yo-kai Watch Model Zero was replicated from Japan's Zeroshiki. It has differences, such as it's louder, its medals were not translucent, and it had an exclusive feature that only America got: Yo-Motion, which is a 3-frame projection feature with Season 2 Medals. This watch is the 2nd U.S. watch. Japan currently has 4 major models. This would later be a predecessor to Yo-kai Watch U Prototype, and then the Yo-kai Watch Dream officially dubbed with Sushi and Tempura. The Normal, Z and Classic Medals were high in numbers for a Yo-kai Watch collector. Season 1 Medals would be sold in any area that sells toys. The Season 2 Medals are not that easy to find. Only about 10 different toy sellers sell these. S1 Medals would come in packs of 3. S2 Medals would come in packs of 2. Season 3 (U, Merican, and Song Medals) Medals and Season 4 (Dream Medals) Medals are fully impossible to find in this period of time.

Reception

Critical reception

Reviewers from the Japanese video game magazine Famitsu scored both Yo-kai Watch 2: Ganso and Honke a 36 out of 40, with all of the four judges of the review giving the game 9 out of 10; identical to Famitsus scores for the original Yo-kai Watch The magazine also gave the same score to Yo-kai Watch 2: Shinuchi upon its release in December 2014.

Western reviews were more mixed, with critics praising the game's charm and inclusion of more Yo-kai, but criticized it for not fixing issues that were present in the original game and the padding present in the game. It currently holds a 72 for Bony Spirits and a 70 for Fleshy Souls on Metacritic.

The reviews for Psychic Specters on the other hand were a tad more favourable, with it holding a 73 on Metacritic.

Sequel

The sequel to the games, also featuring a dual release with the secondary titles branding Yo-kai Watch 3: Sushi and Tempura, were released in Japan on July 16, 2016. A third version of the game, branded Yo-kai Watch 3: Sukiyaki, was released in Japan on December 15, 2016. Sukiyaki was localized for English speakers without the secondary branding, released in PAL regions on December 7, 2018, and in North America on February 8, 2019.

References

External links

2014 video games
Level-5 (company) games
Nintendo 3DS eShop games
Nintendo 3DS games
Nintendo 3DS-only games
Nintendo games
Nintendo Network games
Open-world video games
Role-playing video games
Video games featuring protagonists of selectable gender
Video games about size change
Video games about time travel
Video games developed in Japan
Video games set in Japan
Video games with alternative versions
Yo-kai Watch video games
Japan Game Awards' Game of the Year winners
Multiplayer and single-player video games